Gary Stites (born July 23, 1940) is an American pop singer who enjoyed brief success in the late 1950s.

Stites is best remembered for his top 40 hit, "Lonely for You", which bore a significant sonic resemblance to the Conway Twitty song "It's Only Make Believe". The tune peaked at No. 24 on the Billboard Hot 100 in 1959, and a follow-up single, "Starry Eyed", peaked at No. 77 later that same year. It would hit the No. 1 spot in the UK for Michael Holliday. Stites released a full-length album on Carlton Records in 1960, but it was his only LP.

References

American country singer-songwriters
Carlton Records artists
Living people
1940 births
Place of birth missing (living people)